Andriy Serhiyovych Kuptsov (born 23 January 1971) is a Ukrainian professional football manager and former player.

Playing career
Kuptsov played for teams including FC Metalurh Donetsk, FC Torpedo Zaporizhia, FC Kryvbas Kryvyi Rih, FC Karpaty Lviv, FC Shakhtar Donetsk and FC Kremin Kremenchuk.

References

External links
 

1971 births
Living people
Sportspeople from Kryvyi Rih
Soviet footballers
Ukrainian footballers
Ukrainian Premier League players
FC Shakhtar Donetsk players
FC Shakhtar-2 Donetsk players
FC Kremin Kremenchuk players
FC Metalurh Donetsk players
FC Karpaty Lviv players
FC Kryvbas Kryvyi Rih players
FC Torpedo Zaporizhzhia players
Expatriate footballers in Russia
Ukrainian football managers
FC Oleksandriya managers
FC Nyva Ternopil managers
Expatriate football managers in Azerbaijan
Ukrainian Premier League managers
Ukrainian First League managers
Association football midfielders